Agasarahalli may refer to:

 Agasarahalli, Nelamangala, a village in Karnataka, India
 Agasarahalli (Channarayapatna), a village in Karnataka, India
 Agasarahalli (Hosadurga), a village in Karnataka, India
 Agasarahalli (Hosakote), a village in Karnataka, India
 Agasarahalli (Krishnarajpet), a village in Karnataka, India